“Honored Scientist” is the one of state honorary titles in Azerbaijan given by the Decree of the President of the Republic of Azerbaijan on approval of the Regulations on "Honorary Titles of the Republic of Azerbaijan".

Canditions 
The honorary title of Azerbaijan was given to scholars and scientific-practitioners who have been working in science for at least fifteen years, who are scientific degrees and professors of scientific institutions, higher educational institutions and other organizations by the President of the Republic with the submission of the National Assembly or the Cabinet of Azerbaijan.

The Honorary Title Certificate and its badge are presented in the ceremonial and public place by the President of Azerbaijan. Citizens who are awarded honorary titles of the Republic of Azerbaijan wear the badge on the left chest. This honorary title is given to citizens of Azerbaijan as well as foreigners. They have to have worked in this field at least 20 years. It is not given to a person for the second time. A person awarded the honorary title may be deprived of the honorary title in the case of:

 conviction for a serious crime;
 committing an offense that tarnished the honorary title

List of Honored Scientists of the Republic of Azerbaijan 

 Akif Alizadeh
 Arif Salimov
 Aslan Atakishiyev

See also 

 Heydar Aliyev Prize
 Heydar Aliyev Order
 Honored Cultural Worker of Azerbaijan

References 

Orders, decorations, and medals of Azerbaijan
Honorary titles of Azerbaijan
Awards established in 1998
1998 establishments in Azerbaijan